FastCAD is a type of CAD program for DOS and Microsoft Windows users. It is also the basis for the map-drawing software Campaign Cartographer. It uses the file extension FCW for its files.

The current FastCAD release, version 7, is a full professional tool, including 3D modeling and rendering, symbol definition editing, and advanced capabilities for working with multiple drawings and overlays. FastCAD is written in x86 assembly language and will run well on basic hardware. 

FastCAD was written by Mike Riddle, the author of Interact for the Marinchip 9900 released back in 1979, one of the first PC-based CAD programs. Interact went on to become the architectural basis for early versions of AutoCAD.

EasyCAD is the 2D-only version of FastCAD.

External links
 http://fastcad.com
 

Computer-aided design software